The women's individual road race at the 1984 Los Angeles Summer Olympics was the first time that a women's cycling event had been included in the Olympic program. The race took place on Sunday July 29, 1984 along the major roads within Mission Viejo, California. There were 45 participants in the race, from 16 nations, with one cyclist who did not finish.

Final classification

References

External links
 Official Report

Road cycling at the 1984 Summer Olympics
Cycling at the Summer Olympics – Women's road race
1984 in women's road cycling
Cycl